Super flare may refer to:

 Superflare, an extremely large stellar flare on a solar-type star
 Solar flare generally, especially a large solar flare
 Carrington Event, a geomagnetic storm associated with a large solar flare
 March 1989 geomagnetic storm, a geomagnetic storm associated with a large solar flare
 Flare star, a variable star that can undergo unpredictable dramatic increases in brightness for a few minutes